is a Shinto shrine in Daisen, Tottori Prefecture, Japan. It is celebrated for its cherry blossoms. It is one of the Fifteen Shrines of the Kenmu Restoration, dedicated to the memory of Nawa Nagatoshi.

See also

 Mount Daisen
 Ōgamiyama Jinja
Beppyo shrines

References

Shinto shrines in Tottori Prefecture
Daisen, Tottori